Blue Room Released was an electronic music record label from London, England. It operated from 1994 until 2002. and was run by Simon Ghahary.

Blue Room Released started operating in 1994 with financial backing from the B&W loudspeaker company, based in Steyning, West Sussex, England. It was founded by Simon Ghahary, the designer and founder of Blue Room Loudspeakers who was responsible for the design and identity of the "pod" speaker series. It was based in Shoreditch, London (1995-2000) with an office in San Francisco (1997-2000). In 1996, Robert Trunz backed the venture independently with Ghahary at the helm. Blue Room was musically A&R by Simon Ghahary, with label manager Mick Paterson (formerly from Novamute/Mute Records) and was dedicated to the electronic underground, releasing techno, trance, dub, and ambient music. The label signings such as Juno Reactor, Total Eclipse, Koxbox, X-Dream, Eternal Basement, from in and around Europe, it set out to find other artists around the world, and showcased these finds on compilations, such Outside the Reactor (compiled with DJ Mike Maquire), The Trip Through Sound, Made On Earth and Signs of Life series (compiled in-house by Ghahary). Some of the music genres it had released include trance, breaks, dub, chillout, and electronica.

The record label connected Blue Room Loudspeakers to the forefront of musical innovation through an assembled global roster of talented electronic music artists pushing the envelope with sound. Ghahary also directed and cultivated its unique visual imprint designing record covers, (initially with Think electric), adverts, posters merchandise and various collaborations with underground psychedelic artists. Blue Room had a wholesome live scene, touring as a label around the world with live acts and DJ's including Dino Psaras, Xavier Morales, Mike Maquire, Frank'E, Serge Souque, Lucas Mees, Adam Ohana, and Simon G. Parties also took place regularly and locally in London with Ahimsaproductions.

With its office in San Francisco run by Nick Crayson and the Blue Room Americas team, including Adam Ohana it supported the first music appearing within the Burning Man Festival.

This platform would later grant Trunz access to Blue Room music producers and artists for collaborations with his international roster of musicians from the MELT2000 label.

Released discography

See also 
 List of record labels
 List of electronic music record labels
 List of independent UK record labels

References

Record labels established in 1994
Record labels disestablished in 2002
British independent record labels
Psychedelic trance record labels